McCoppin is a surname. Notable people with the surname include:

Frank McCoppin (1834–1897), American politician
George Washington McCoppin (1904–1993), American politician
Peter McCoppin (born 1948), Canadian conductor and organist
Suzy McCoppin (born 1978), American actress and columnist